The Alexandra Palace television station in North London is one of the oldest television transmission sites in the world. What was at the time called "high definition" (405-line) TV broadcasts on VHF were beamed from this mast from 1936 until the outbreak of World War II.  It then lay dormant until it was used very successfully to foil the German Y-Gerät radio navigation system during the last stages of the Battle of Britain. After the war, it was reused for television until 1956, when it was superseded by the opening of the BBC's new main transmitting station for the London area at Crystal Palace. In 1982 Alexandra Palace became an active transmitting station again, with the opening of a relay transmitter to provide UHF television service to parts of North London poorly covered from Crystal Palace.

The transmitter is owned and maintained by Arqiva.

Channels listed by frequency

Analogue radio (FM)

Digital radio (DAB)

Digital television
Digital television replaced the analogue television signals during the digital switchover of April 2012. However, only 3 of the 6 multiplexes are available: BBC A & B and Digital 3&4.

BBC A launched on UHF 61 on 4 April 2012, before moving to its final allocation of UHF 49 on 18 April, when BBC B and Digital 3&4 launched. As part of the 700 MHz clearance programme the UHF channel numbers were changed in March 2018.

Analogue television
Analogue television is no longer transmitted from Alexandra Palace. BBC Two was closed on UHF 64 on 4 April 2012, when ITV1 temporarily moved into its frequency. The remaining three analogue services closed down on 18 April 2012.

Aerial group: C/D
Polarisation: horizontal

References

External links
The Transmission Gallery: Photographs and Information

Transmitter sites in England
Infrastructure in London
Alexandra Palace
History of television in the United Kingdom